Rize is R&B singer Dwele's 2000 self-released demo.

Track listing

Dwele albums
2000 debut albums